The Giant's Causeway is an area of about 40,000 interlocking basalt columns, the result of an ancient volcanic fissure eruption. It is located in County Antrim on the north coast of Northern Ireland, about three miles (5 km) northeast of the town of Bushmills.

It was declared a World Heritage Site by UNESCO in 1986 and a national nature reserve by the Department of the Environment for Northern Ireland in 1987. In a 2005 poll of Radio Times readers, the Giant's Causeway was named the fourth-greatest natural wonder in the United Kingdom. 

The tops of the columns form stepping stones that lead from the cliff foot and disappear under the sea. Most of the columns are 
hexagonal, although some have four, five, seven or eight sides. The tallest are about 12 metres (39 ft) high, and the solidified lava in the cliffs is 28 metres (92 ft) thick in places.

Much of the Giant's Causeway and Causeway Coast World Heritage Site is owned and managed by the National Trust. It is one of the most popular tourist attractions in Northern Ireland, receiving over 998,000 visitors in 2019. Access to the Giant's Causeway is free of charge: it is not necessary to go via the visitor centre, which charges a fee. The remainder of the site is owned by the Crown Estate and several private landowners.

Geology
Around 50 to 60 million years ago, during the Paleocene Epoch, Antrim was subject to intense volcanic activity, when highly fluid molten basalt intruded through chalk beds to form an extensive volcanic plateau. As the lava cooled, contraction occurred. Horizontal contraction fractured in a similar way to drying mud, with the cracks propagating down as the mass cooled, leaving pillarlike structures, which also fractured horizontally into "biscuits". In many cases, the horizontal fracture resulted in a bottom face that is convex, while the upper face of the lower segment is concave, producing what are called "ball and socket" joints. The size of the columns was primarily determined by the speed at which lava cooled. The extensive fracture network produced the distinctive columns seen today. The basalts were originally part of a great volcanic plateau called the Thulean Plateau, which formed during the Paleocene.

Geological heritage site
In respect of its key role in the development of volcanology as a geoscience discipline, and notably the origin of basalt, the Palaeocene rocks of the Giant's Causeway and Causeway Coast were included by the International Union of Geological Sciences (IUGS) in its assemblage of 100 "geological heritage sites" around the world in a listing published in October 2022.

Legend

According to legend, the columns are the remains of a causeway built by a giant. The story goes that the Irish giant Fionn mac Cumhaill (Finn MacCool), from the Fenian Cycle of Gaelic mythology, was challenged to a fight by the Scottish giant Benandonner. Fionn accepted the challenge and built the causeway across the North Channel so that the two could meet. In one version of the story, Fionn defeats Benandonner. In another, Fionn hides from Benandonner when he realises that his foe is much bigger than he is. Fionn's wife, Sadhbh, disguises Fionn as a baby and tucks him in a cradle. When Benandonner sees the size of the "baby", he reckons that its father, Fionn, must be a giant among giants. He flees back to Scotland in fright, destroying the causeway behind him so that Fionn would be unable to chase him down. Across the sea, there are identical basalt columns (a part of the same ancient lava flow) at Fingal's Cave on the Scottish isle of Staffa, and it is possible that the story was influenced by this.

Overall in Irish mythology, Fionn mac Cumhaill is not a giant but a hero with supernatural abilities, contrary to what this particular legend may suggest. In Fairy and Folk Tales of the Irish Peasantry (1888), it is noted that, over time, "the pagan gods of Ireland [...] grew smaller and smaller in the popular imagination until they turned into the fairies; the pagan heroes grew bigger and bigger until they turned into the giants". There are no surviving pre-Christian stories about the Giant's Causeway, but it may have originally been associated with the Fomorians (Fomhóraigh); the Irish name Clochán na bhFomhóraigh or Clochán na bhFomhórach means "stepping stones of the Fomhóraigh". The Fomhóraigh are a race of mythological beings in Irish mythology who were sometimes described as giants and who may have originally been part of a pre-Christian pantheon.

Tourism

The Bishop of Derry visited the site in 1692. The existence of the causeway was announced to the wider world the following year by the presentation of a paper to the Royal Society from Sir Richard Bulkeley, a fellow of Trinity College, Dublin. The Giant's Causeway received international attention when Dublin artist Susanna Drury made watercolour paintings of it in 1739; they won Drury the first award presented by the Royal Dublin Society in 1740 and were engraved in 1743. In 1765, an entry on the causeway appeared in volume 12 of the French Encyclopédie, which was informed by the engravings of Drury's work; the engraving of the "East Prospect" appeared in a 1768 volume of plates published for the Encyclopédie. In the caption to the plates, French geologist Nicolas Desmarest suggested, for the first time in print, that such structures were volcanic in origin.

The site first became popular with tourists during the 19th century, particularly after the opening of the Giant's Causeway Tramway, and only after the National Trust took over its care in the 1960s were some of the vestiges of commercialism removed. Visitors can walk over the basalt columns that are at the edge of the sea, a half-mile walk from the entrance of the site.

Visitor centre

The causeway was without a permanent visitor centre between 2000 and 2012, as the previous building, built in 1986, burned down in 2000. While preliminary approval was given for a publicly funded (but privately managed) development by then Environment Minister and DUP member Arlene Foster in 2007, the public funding was frozen due to a perceived conflict-of-interest between the proposed private developer and the DUP. Ultimately, the private developer dropped a legal challenge to the publicly funded plan, and the new visitor centre was officially opened by 2012. Its construction was funded by the National Trust, the Northern Ireland Tourist Board, the Heritage Lottery Fund and public donations. Since opening, the new visitor centre has garnered mixed reviews from those visiting the causeway, for its pricing, design, contents and placement across the causeway walk descent. In 2018, the visitor centre was visited by 1,011,473 people.

There was some controversy regarding the content of some exhibits in the visitor centre, which refer to the Young Earth Creationist view of the age of the Earth. While these inclusions were welcomed by the chairman of the Northern Irish evangelical group, the Caleb Foundation, the National Trust stated that the inclusions formed only a small part of the exhibition and that the Trust "fully supports the scientific explanation for the creation of the stones 60 million years ago." An online campaign to remove creationist material was launched in 2012, and following this, the Trust carried out a review and concluded that they should be amended to have the scientific explanation on the causeway's origin as their primary emphasis. Creationist explanations are still mentioned but presented as a traditional belief of some religious communities rather than a competing explanation for the causeway's origins.

Notable features
Some of the structures in the area, having been subject to several million years of weathering, resemble objects, such as the Organ and Giant's Boot structures. Other features include many reddish, weathered low columns known as Giant's Eyes, created by the displacement of basalt boulders; the Shepherd's Steps; the Honeycomb; the Giant's Harp; the Chimney Stacks; the Giant's Gate and the Camel's Hump.

Flora and fauna
The area is a haven for seabirds, such as fulmar, petrel, cormorant, shag, redshank, guillemot and razorbill, while the weathered rock formations host numerous plant types, including sea spleenwort, hare's-foot trefoil, vernal squill, sea fescue and frog orchid. A stromatolite colony was reportedly found at the Giant's Causeway in October 2011 – an unusual find, as stromatolites are more commonly found in warmer waters with higher saline content than that found at the causeway.

Similar structures

Basalt columns are a common volcanic feature, and they occur on many scales, with faster cooling producing smaller columns.

Transport access 
The Belfast-Derry railway line run by Northern Ireland Railways connects to Coleraine and along the Coleraine-Portrush branch line to Portrush. Locally, Ulsterbus provides connections to the railway stations.

References

Further reading

 
 
 Deane, C. Douglas. 1983. The Ulster Countryside. Century Books.

External links 

 Giant's Causeway information at the National Trust
 Website and video of the Causeway Coast and Glens Heritage Trust
 Causeway Coast And Glens Tourism – Official Tourist Board visitor information for the Causeway and surrounding area
 Landscapes Unlocked – Aerial footage from BBC Sky High series explaining the physical, social & economic geography of Northern Ireland

Fenian Cycle
Landforms of County Antrim
Geology of Northern Ireland
National Trust properties in Northern Ireland
Northern Ireland coast
Columnar basalts
World Heritage Sites in Northern Ireland
Tourist attractions in County Antrim
Natural history museums in Northern Ireland
Volcanism of Northern Ireland
Paleogene volcanism
Paleogene Ireland
Extinct volcanism
Protected areas established in 1986
Patterned grounds
Nature reserves in Northern Ireland
Protected areas of County Antrim
1986 establishments in the United Kingdom
Rock formations of Northern Ireland
Aviation accidents and incidents locations in Northern Ireland
Geotourism in the United Kingdom
First 100 IUGS Geological Heritage Sites